"Keep Us Together" is the third and final single from the album On the Outside by British band Starsailor. It peaked at number 47 on the UK Singles Chart, spending just one week in the top 75. The song has been used frequently by BBC's main football television programme 'Match of the Day'

Music video 
 
The video promo for Keep us together starts with a light framing the band.  The band continue playing the song with some fireworks around them at the end of the video.  In some scenes during the video the camera get out of focus the band members and at the end of the video they're covered with confetti.

Track listing 
 "Keep Us Together"
 "Rise Up"

Charts

References 

Starsailor (band) songs
2005 songs
2006 singles
EMI Records singles
Songs written by Barry Westhead
Songs written by Ben Byrne
Songs written by James Stelfox
Songs written by James Walsh (musician)